False precision (also called overprecision, fake precision, misplaced precision and spurious precision) occurs when numerical data are presented in a manner that implies better precision than is justified; since precision is a limit to accuracy (in the ISO definition of accuracy), this often leads to overconfidence in the accuracy, named precision bias.

Overview
Madsen Pirie defines the term "false precision" in a more general way: when exact numbers are used for notions that cannot be expressed in exact terms. For example, "We know that 90% of the difficulty in writing is getting started." Often false precision is abused to produce an unwarranted confidence in the claim: "our mouthwash is twice as good as our competitor's".

In science and engineering, convention dictates that unless a margin of error is explicitly stated, the number of significant figures used in the presentation of data should be limited to what is warranted by the precision of those data. For example, if an instrument can be read to tenths of a unit of measurement, results of calculations using data obtained from that instrument can only be confidently stated to the tenths place, regardless of what the raw calculation returns or whether other data used in the calculation are more accurate. Even outside these disciplines, there is a tendency to assume that all the non-zero digits of a number are meaningful; thus, providing excessive figures may lead the viewer to expect better precision than exists.

However, in contrast, it is good practice to retain more significant figures than this in the intermediate stages of a calculation, in order to avoid accumulated rounding errors.

False precision commonly arises when high-precision and low-precision data are combined, and in conversion of units.

Examples 
False precision is the gist of numerous variations of a joke which can be summarized as follows: A tour guide at a museum says a dinosaur skeleton is 100,000,005 years old, because an expert told him that it was 100 million years old when he started working there 5 years ago.

If a car's speedometer indicates the vehicle is travelling at 60 mph and that is converted to km/h, it would equal 96.5606 km/h. The conversion from the whole number in one system to the precise result in another makes it seem like the measurement was very precise, when in fact it was not.

Measures that rely on statistical sampling, such as IQ tests, are often reported with false precision.

See also

Arithmetic underflow
Limit of detection
Precision bias
Propagation of uncertainty
Round-off error
Rounding
Significant figures

References

Arithmetic
Numerical analysis

de:Signifikante_Stellen